Act of Valor: The Album is the soundtrack to the 2012 film Act of Valor. It was released on February 24, 2012. It consists of ten songs, all performed by country music singers.

Content
Keith Urban's "For You" was released as a single from the album, and all proceeds from the single were donated to the Navy SEAL foundation. Lady Antebellum's "I Was Here" was previously released on AT&T Team USA Soundtrack in 2009.

Critical reception
Giving it three stars out of five, Billy Dukes of Taste of Country criticized the "homogenized" production but praised the vocals. He also said that "On its own it’s little more than a depressing collection of songs by really talented country artists. However, each song will no doubt take on new meaning after watching scenes of US Navy SEALS on the big screen." Great American Country's Daryl Addison called it "in essence a concept album that is on one hand magnificently Patriotic, and on the other artistically thought-provoking."

Track listing

Chart performance

Album

Singles

References

2012 soundtrack albums
Country music soundtracks
Action film soundtracks